NCO (netCDF Operators) is a suite of programs designed to facilitate manipulation and analysis of self-describing data stored in the netCDF format.

Program Suite
ncap2 netCDF arithmetic processor
ncatted netCDF attribute editor
ncbo netCDF binary operator (includes addition, multiplication and others)
ncclimo netCDF climatology generator
nces  netCDF ensemble statistics
ncecat netCDF ensemble concatenator
ncflint netCDF file interpolator
ncks netCDF kitchen sink
ncpdq netCDF permute dimensions quickly, pack data quietly
ncra netCDF record averager
ncrcat netCDF record concatenator
ncremap  netCDF remaper
ncrename netCDF renamer
ncwa netCDF weighted averager

References

External links
 

Meteorological data and networks